Hyung-Taik Lee and Vladimir Voltchkov were the defending champions but only Lee competed that year with Brian Vahaly.

Lee and Vahaly lost in the quarterfinals to Jeff Coetzee and Chris Haggard.

James Blake and Mardy Fish won in the final 6–2, 7–5 against Rick Leach and Brian MacPhie.

Seeds
Champion seeds are indicated in bold text while text in italics indicates the round in which those seeds were eliminated.

 Scott Humphries /  Mark Merklein (first round)
 Jordan Kerr /  Jim Thomas (quarterfinals)
 Todd Perry /  Thomas Shimada (quarterfinals)
 Rick Leach /  Brian MacPhie (final)

Draw

External links
 2004 Siebel Open Doubles draw

SAP Open
2004 ATP Tour